Diadasia enavata, the sunflower chimney bee, is a species of chimney bee in the family Apidae. It is found in Central America and North America.

References

Further reading

External links

 

Apinae
Articles created by Qbugbot
Insects described in 1872